A pen-down strike (sometimes known as a tool-down strike or dropping pen), is a form of nonviolent strike action or a peaceful protest in which an organized group of private, government workers or its associated professionals partially attends their offices in public or private sector without being involved in office management or simply duty. Pen-down usually leading employees to stop their work in protest of to meet their official or professional demands as promised or signed between an employer, organization, government and their employees. In government departments, it is usually observed by the non-gazetted employees in a civil disobedience manner by the workers in an attempt to reach to a consensus.

In some countries, a pen-down strike may not be recognized violation of law. In India, pen-down is mentioned in the Industrial Disputes Act, 1947 which defines it as a "labour action". Since it is a symbolic or a nonviolence protest, it achieves 
goals without being involved in a direct action and demonstration. Pen-down strike was popularized by the government or private employees in India and Pakistan where workers widely observe pen down strikes in order to fulfill their claims or requirements associated with their job or emotions. Sometimes, a pen-down strike is observed in solidarity with other employees working in relevant field when there has been any discrimination or unlawful activity found as seen by the employees.

Pen-down strikes are also seen at public hospitals where doctors hold a partial protest and refuse to aid medical treatment to patients, excluding in times of life-threatening situations, and while it is a nonviolent protest or strike, employees continue to work in emergency departments and provide emergency medicine to patients.

See also 
 Hunger strike
 Sitdown strike

References

Civil disobedience
Protest tactics
Strikes (protest)